Keterisi is a village in the historical region of Khevi, north-eastern Georgia. It is located on the right bank of the river Tergi. Administratively, it is part of the Kazbegi Municipality in Mtskheta-Mtianeti. It is 32 km from the municipality centre of Stepantsminda.

See also 
Ketrisi Mineral Vaucluse

Sources 
 Georgian Soviet Encyclopedia, V. 2, pp. 478–479, Tbilisi, 1980 year.
 ქეთერისის მინერალური ვოკლუზის ბუნების ძეგლი

References

Kobi Community villages